The GCR Classes 9D, 9H and 9M (LNER Class J10) were a class of 124 0-6-0 Steam locomotives designed by Harry Pollitt for freight work on the Manchester, Sheffield and Lincolnshire Railway (MS&LR) later renamed Great Central Railway (GCR).

Career

Great Central Railway
During World War I, seven of them were loaned to the Caledonian Railway. They were modified to have shorter chimneys. In 1921, 10 were sent to Barrow-in-Furness to undergo repairs.

London and North Eastern Railway
The locomotives passed to the London and North Eastern Railway (LNER) in 1923. The LNER classified them as J10 with sub-classes J10/1 to J10/6 because of detail differences. Withdrawals began in 1933, but were rather slow.

British Railways
Some 78 locomotives  survived into British Railways (BR) ownership in 1948 as follows:
 J10/2,  4
 J10/4, 38
 J10/6, 36
 
BR numbers were  65126–65209 (with gaps). In the 1950s, some of them were sent to work at sheds once belonged to the LMS, the L&YR, and the LNWR. They were also reported to be popular with ex-LMS employees. All locomotives had been withdrawn by 1961 with the last one in service No. 65157 going in August 1961. None were preserved.

References

09D
0-6-0 locomotives
Railway locomotives introduced in 1892
Kitson locomotives
Beyer, Peacock locomotives
Scrapped locomotives
Freight locomotives
Standard gauge steam locomotives of Great Britain